William or Billy Pratt may refer to:

 William Abbott Pratt (1818–1879), American photographer
 William B. Pratt (1935–2019), American physician and politician
 William Pratt (MP for Southwark), English politician
 William Henry Pratt, real name of actor Boris Karloff 
 William Pratt (born 1609), ancestor of the Pratt-Romney family
 William Pratt (rugby league) (1932–2009), English rugby league footballer of the 1950s for Leeds, and Halifax
 William V. Pratt (1869–1957), admiral in the United States Navy
 William Pratt (cricketer) (1895–1974), English cricketer
 William Dymock Pratt (1854–1916), English architect
 William Pratt (businessman) (1928–1999), Canadian businessman
 Billy Pratt (footballer, born 1872) (1872–?), English football winger for Small Heath from 1889 to 1892
 Billy Pratt (footballer, born 1874) (1874–?), English football full-back for Small Heath from 1894 to 1902
 Spike (Buffy the Vampire Slayer), a character from television series Buffy the Vampire Slayer